The 2000 Cal State Northridge Matadors football team represented California State University, Northridge as a member of the Big Sky Conference during the 2000 NCAA Division I-AA football season. Led by second-year head coach Jeff Kearin, Cal State Northridge compiled an overall record of 4–7 with a mark of 2–6 in conference play, tying for seventh place in the Big Sky. The Matadors played home games at North Campus Stadium in Northridge, California.

Schedule

References

Cal State Northridge
Cal State Northridge Matadors football seasons
Cal State Northridge Matadors football